KRI Dewaruci (sometimes spelled Dewa Ruci or Dewarutji) is a Class A tall ship and the only barquentine owned and operated by the Indonesian Navy. She is used as a sail training vessel for naval cadets and is the largest tall ship in the Indonesian fleet. Dewaruci also serves as a goodwill ambassador for Indonesia to the rest of the world.

Built in Germany by H. C. Stülcken Sohn at Steinwerder, Hamburg. Construction of Dewaruci began in 1932, but was suspended due to the outbreak of World War II, which caused heavy damage to the shipyard where she was being constructed. She was launched on 24 January 1953 and completed on 9 July that year. Since then, she has been based at Surabaya on the Java Sea. Her name and figurehead represent and display the mythological Javanese wayang god of truth and courage. The vessel was also used in the making of Anna and the King movie, starring Jodie Foster.

Dewaruci also participates in tall ship races and events around the world. As a unique feature, the ship has her own marching band. In 2010 Dewarucis marching band delighted and entertained the crowds in Hartlepool at the Tall Ships Crew Parade. Their energy, enthusiasm, and skill won them the prize for the best crew in the crew parade.

Due to her age, Dewaruci is to be decommissioned and displayed at a naval museum. The Indonesian Parliament has agreed to buy a new tall ship and has appropriated $80 million (Rp720 billion) for the purpose. The new vessel is to be completed in 2014.

The three masts are named after three of the sons of Pandu, from the Pandava. Foremast, named "Bima"—)

 Flying jib
 Outer jib
 Middle jib
 Inner jib
 Royal
 Topgallant
 Upper topsail
 Lower topsail
 Foresail

Mainmast, named "Arjuna"—

 Main topgallant
 Main topmast staysail
 Main staysail
 Main topsail
 Mainsail

Mizzenmast, named "Yudhistira"—

 Mizzen topsail
 Mizzen

References

External links

 American Sail Training Association. Sail Tall Ships! A Directory of Sail Training and Adventure at Sea, 15th Edition. Canada: Dollco Printing, 2003.
 Koza, Thaddeus.  The Tall Ships. East Hartford, Conn.: Tide-Mark Press, 1996.

1953 ships
Barquentines
Individual sailing vessels
Tall ships of Indonesia
Training ships of the Indonesian Navy
Sail training ships